The Association of Greek Tourism Enterprises, commonly abbreviated to SETE (ΣΕΤΕ), is a non-governmental, non-profit organization founded in 1991. It is the representative Association for unions of tourism enterprises in Greece, as well as independent companies operating across the broader tourism sector.

History

The original 9 entrepreneurs who met in Elounda, Crete to discuss the creation of the association were:
 Spyros Kokotos, of Elounda S.A. Hotels and Resorts, and first president of the Association
 Nikos Angelopoulos, of ALDEMAR Hotels & Spa, the current president
 Dia Capsis, of Capsis Hotels & Resorts
 Nikos Metaxas, of Maris Hotels
 Nikos Daskalandonakis, of Grecotel Hotels
 Yannis Sbokos, of the Sbokos Hotels Group
 Gina Mamidakis, of Bluegr Mamidakis Hotels
 Tasos Grigoriadis, of Chalkidiki hotels
 Stefanos Voulgaris, of Corfu hotel

In order to fulfill the legal requirement of 20 members, the following 14 were added to the original group and became the 23 founding members of the Association:

 Thedore Vassilakis, of Autohellas and Aegean Airlines
 Georgios Vernicos, of Vernicos Yachts
 Vassilis Konstandakopoulos, of Costamare Shipping and Navarino Resorts
 Dakis Ioannou, of J&P Overseas and Athenaum Intercontinental
 George Tsilidis
 Manolis Tsatsakis
 Konstantinos Koulouvatos
 Stelios Golemis
 Antonis Mousamas
 Maria Argyrou
 Manolis Papakaliatis
 Elias Kammenos
 Stelios Seferiades, formerly of Astir Hotels
 Constantine Mitsis, of Mitsis Hotels

Organizational aims
SETE aims constantly at boosting competitiveness and demonstrating the key role of tourism in the Greek economy. More specifically, SETE: 
 Underlines the impact of tourism on the economy, the society and the environment
 Informs the Government, the broader public sector and the business community regarding developments in the international tourism market 
 Promotes co-operation between public and private sectors
 Represents its Members in national and international organizations 
 Establishes platforms of collaboration among the various tourism branches and between tourism and other sectors of the economy  
 Co-operates with Greek and international research centres in the fields of tourism and economy
 Aims for the creation and dissemination of tourism industry know how

Activities

Research
SETE positions are based on continuous research, study and analysis of the special features of tourism economy.

SETE:
 studies the status and contribution of tourism to Greek economy
 proposes measures for the improvement of quality and the competitiveness enhancement 
 monitors the international developments 
 analyses the growth of tourism sector in competitor countries

SETE research work is supported per case by its staff, expert consultants and university research centres. The results are disseminated and promoted through publications, seminars and through the web.

sete.gr provides information for professionals and researchers in the wider tourism economy.

SETE offices house a library with Greek and foreign publications on tourism.

Education & Training
SETE actively supports the work of researchers, experts and students and collaborates with the academic community.

Members of SETE Board of Directors and the Association's Executives are regular speakers and lecturers at events and programs held by partner universities.

SETE proposals regarding tourism training include:
 the establishment of tourism studies faculties in Greek universities 
 the co-ordination between the various levels of studies and tourism education bodies
 the continuous education for tourism entrepreneurs and professionals 
 correlation of market needs with training policies and practices 
 production of research directly linked to actual tourism needs.

Membership
SETE Members fall into two main categories:
 unions of tourism enterprises representing on national level the accommodation, travel, transportation (air, land and sea), exhibitions, conferences and other sectors related to the tourism industry and
 enterprises across the entire spectrum of direct and indirect tourism activities, including: hotels, travel agencies, transportation, airlines, car rental, cruise ships, sea-ferries, tourist coach services, yachts, as well as tourist interest companies like banks, business consultants, catering, construction companies, development companies, expo-conference organizers, marketing – management companies, museums, publishing, real estate, restaurants, special tourism infrastructure (golf, marinas, conference centres, exhibitions, etc.), vineyards – wineries.

SETE provides a series of services to its Members, in a joint effort to create a more favourable environment for boosting tourism and entrepreneurship:

 Information

SETE Members receive circular documentation, studies and data about markets which concern Greek tourism, and about specific market segments. Moreover, SETE Members are informed on the press releases and the interventions made by SETE to Greek government and the broader public sector.

 Participation

SETE Members can be involved in shaping tourism policy positions and proposals by actively participating in the meetings and events held by SETE (General Assemblies, conferences, regional events, business lunches).

 Promotion

SETE web pages, events and publications allow for the promotion of businesses and services to selected target groups. SETE Members can be promoted through its regular publications for information purposes, i.e. the SETE Annual Report, the e-newsletter “Corporate Citizenship - Members Activities” and the e-newsletter “Members Business News”.

International presence
Tourism is one of the most significant economic activities in the world and the main field of international competition. SETE is present in the major international fora:
 United Nations World Tourism Organization (UNWTO), as an Affiliate Member since 1993
 UNWTO Business Council 
 Statistics and TSA Committee of the UN World Tourism Organization 
 International Hotel & Restaurant Association (IH&RA), as a member
 The Travel Partnership Corporation (TTPC), as a member 
 Various international committees, working groups and councils, either as a full member or as an observer.

Moreover, SETE cooperates with:
WTTC (World Travel and Tourism Council), OECD (Organisation for Economic Co-operation and Development), IMF (International Monetary Fund), IFTO (International Federation of Tour Operators), IAGTO (International Association of Golf Tour Operators), TYD (Turkish Tourism Investors Association), Egyptian Tourism Federation, Exceltur (Spain), Visit Britain, Maison de la France, IMG Tourism, Tourism Intelligence International, ILM Hospitality & Tourism, IPK International, THR Barcelona, Monitor Group, Mintel, Phocuswright, Tourism Industry Intelligence, Eye for Travel

References

https://web.archive.org/web/20100704214203/http://www.sete.gr/files/Media/CORPORATE_ENG.pdf
https://web.archive.org/web/20100516155638/http://greektourismblog.com/
http://www.greektourism2020.gr/
https://web.archive.org/web/20110407024823/http://unwto.org/

Non-profit organizations based in Greece
Tourism in Greece
Traveling business organizations